Shimek State Forest is an Iowa state forest maintained by the Iowa Department of Natural Resources. Its five units are strung along the Des Moines River a few miles above its confluence with the Upper Mississippi River in Lee and Van Buren Counties in the southeast corner of Iowa. Its  contain one of the largest remaining contiguous forests in the state with large stands of mixed oak-hickory forest with about 1,000 acres (4 km²) of planted pine.

The Farmington, Lick Creek,  Donnellson and Croton units are near Farmington, where the Iowa Bureau of Forestry administrative office is located. The Keosauqua unit is upriver, opposite Keosauqua and adjoins Lacey-Keosauqua State Park and wildlife management areas. The Croton unit is near the site of the Battle of Athens, the most northerly battle of the Civil War, and the only one fought (in part) in Iowa.

The forest has extensive recreational facilities. Campgrounds, fishing, hunting, hiking trails, horseback riding trails and equine facilities are offered.

Its earliest development was by the Civilian Conservation Corps on exhausted, abandoned farmland. In 1950 it was named for Dr. Bohumil Shimek, a Czech-American naturalist, conservationist, and university  professor at the State University of Iowa.

Sources
Iowa State Forests, Iowa Department of Natural Resources, Retrieved July 27, 2007
Shimek State Forest, Iowa Department of Natural Resources, Retrieved July 27, 2007

Iowa state forests
Protected areas of Lee County, Iowa
Protected areas of Van Buren County, Iowa
Civilian Conservation Corps in Iowa
Czech-American culture in Iowa